Project Hyperion, launched in December 2011 by Andreas M. Hein in the context of Icarus Interstellar. Project Hyperion was to perform a preliminary study that defines integrated concepts for a crewed interstellar starship or generation ship. This was a two-year study mainly based out of the WARR student group at the Technical University of Munich (TUM). The study aimed to provide an assessment of the feasibility of crewed interstellar flight using current and near-future technologies. It also aimed to guide future research and technology development plans as well as to inform the public about crewed interstellar travel. 

Notable results of the project include an assessment of world ship system architectures and adequate population size. The project has also been featured in the TV-series Rendezvous with the Future (BBC/Bilibili), popular science books as well as art.

The core team members have transferred to the Initiative for Interstellar Studies's world ship project and have presented their results at the ESA Interstellar Workshop in 2019 as well as in ESA's Acta Futura journal.

References 

Hypothetical technology
Interstellar travel
Hypothetical spacecraft
Space colonization